Marriage in Japan is a legal and social institution at the center of the household. Couples are legally married once they have made the change in status on their family registration sheets, without the need for a ceremony. Most weddings are held either according to Shinto traditions or in chapels according to Christian marriage traditions.

History 
The institution of marriage in Japan has changed radically over the last millennium. Indigenous practices adapted first to Chinese Confucianism during the medieval era, and then to Western concepts of individualism, gender equality, romantic love, and the nuclear family during the modern era. Customs once exclusive to a small aristocracy gained mass popularity as the population became increasingly urbanized.

Heian period (794–1185) 

The Heian period of Japanese history marked the culmination of its classical era, when the vast imperial court established itself and its culture in Heian-kyō (modern Kyoto). Heian society was organized by an elaborate system of rank, and the purpose of marriage was to produce children who would inherit the highest possible rank from the best-placed lineage. It was neither ceremonial nor necessarily permanent.

Aristocrats exchanged letters and poetry for a period of months or years before arranging to meet after dark. If a man saw the same woman for a period of three nights, they were considered married, and the wife's parents held a banquet for the couple. Most members of the lower-class engaged in a permanent marriage with one partner, and husbands arranged to bring their wives into their own household, in order to ensure the legitimacy of their offspring.

High-ranked noblemen sometimes kept multiple wives or concubines. Aristocratic wives could remain in their fathers' house, and the husband would recognize paternity with the formal presentation of a gift. The forms of Heian courtship, as well as the pitfalls of amorous intrigue, are well represented in the literature of the period, especially The Tale of the Bamboo Cutter, The Sarashina Diary, The Pillow Book, and The Tale of Genji.

Edo period (1600–1868) 

The choice to remain single was the greatest crime a man could commit, according to Baron Hozumi.

Marriages were duly arranged by the head of the household, who represented it publicly and was legally responsible for its members, and any preference by either principal in a marital arrangement was considered improper. Property was regarded to belong to the  rather than to individuals, and inheritance was strictly agnatic primogeniture.

Nearly all adoptions are of adult men. Marriage was restricted to households of equal social standing, which made selection a crucial, painstaking process. Although Confucian ethics encouraged people to marry outside their own group, limiting the search to a local community remained the easiest way to ensure an honorable match. Approximately one-in-five marriages in pre-modern Japan occurred between households that were already related.

Outcast communities such as the  could not marry outside of their caste, and marriage discrimination continued even after an 1871 edict abolished the caste system, well into the twentieth century. Marriage between a Japanese and non-Japanese person was not officially permitted until 14 March 1873, a date now commemorated as White Day. Marriage with a foreigner required the Japanese national to surrender his or her social standing.

 
The purposes of marriage in the medieval and Edo periods was to form alliances between families, to relieve the family of its female dependents, to perpetuate the family line, and, especially for the lower classes, to add new members to the family's workforce. The 17th century treatise  ("Greater Learning for Women") instructed wives honor their parents-in-law before their own parents, and to be "courteous, humble, and conciliatory" towards their husbands.

Husbands were also encouraged to place the needs of their parents and children before those of their wives. One British observer remarked, "If you love your wife you spoil your mother's servant." The tension between a housewife and her mother-in-law has been a keynote of Japanese drama ever since.

 played little part in medieval marriages, as emotional attachment was considered inconsistent with filial piety. A proverb said, "Those who come together in passion stay together in tears." For men, sexual gratification was seen as separate from conjugal relations with one's wife, where the purpose was procreation. The  genre of woodblock prints celebrated the luxury and hedonism of the era, typically with depictions of beautiful courtesans and geisha of the pleasure districts. Concubinage and prostitution were common, public, and relatively respectable, until the social upheaval of the Meiji Restoration put an end to feudal society in Japan.

Meiji Restoration and modernization (1868–1912) 

During the Meiji period, upper class and samurai customs of arranged marriage steadily replaced the unions of choice and mutual attraction that rural commoners had once enjoyed. Rapid urbanization and industrialization brought more of the population into the cities, ending the isolation of rural life. Public education became almost universal between 1872 and the early 1900s, and schools stressed the traditional concept of filial piety, first toward the nation, second toward the household, and last of all toward a person's own private interests. Marriage under the Meiji Civil Code required the permission of the head of a household (Article 750) and of the parents for men under 30 and women under 25 (Article 772).

However, their objections carried little weight.

Courtship remained rare in Japan at this period. Boys and girls were separated in schools, in cinemas, and at social gatherings. Colleagues who began a romantic relationship could be dismissed, and during the Second World War traveling couples could be arrested. Parents sometimes staged an arranged marriage to legitimize a "love match," but many others resulted in separation and sometimes suicide. Love was thought to be inessential to marriage. A proposal by Baron Hozumi, who had studied abroad, that the absence of love be made a grounds for divorce failed to pass during debates on the Meiji Civil Code of 1898. One writer observed in 1930, "According to the traditional moral ideas, it is deemed a sign of mental and moral weakness to 'fall in love.'"

Marriage, like other social institutions of this period, emphasized the subordinate inferiority of women to men. Women learned that as a daughter they ought to obey their father, as a wife their husband, as a widow their sons. Chastity in marriage was expected for women, and a law not repealed until 1908 allowed a husband to kill his wife and her lover if he found them in an adulterous act. The prostitution of women survived the periodic intrusion of puritanical ideals on Japan's less restrictive sexuality.

Divorce laws become more equal over time. During the Edo period, a husband could divorce his wife by writing a letter of his intent to do so, but a wife's only recourse was to flee to a convent. The laws of the early Meiji period established several grounds on which a man could divorce: sterility, adultery, disobedience to parents-in-law, loquacity, larceny, jealousy, and disease. A wife, accompanied by a close male relative, could appeal for divorce if she had been deserted or imprisoned by her husband, or if he was profligate or mentally ill. The 1898 Civil Code established the principle of mutual consent, although the consent of women was still likely to be forced until the early 20th century, as women gradually gained access to education and financial independence. The fight for divorce rights marked the beginning of Japanese feminism.

Post-war period (1945–present)
Signed after the surrender and occupation of Japan by Allied forces, Article 24 of the Constitution of 1947 reestablished marriage on grounds of equality and choice: "Marriage shall be based only on the mutual consent of both sexes and it shall be maintained through mutual cooperation with the equal rights of husband and wife as a base. With regard to choice of spouse, property rights, inheritance, choice of domicile, divorce and other matters pertaining to marriage and the family, all laws shall be enacted from the standpoint of individual dignity and the essential equality of the sexes."

The Constitution abolished the foundations of the  system and the patriarchal authority at its heart. Each nuclear family retained, and still retains, a separate family registration sheet, initiated on marriage under the surname of the husband or wife, but the head of each household no longer had any special legal prerogatives over his or her dependents. All legitimate children, male or female, gained an equal right to inheritance, putting an end to primogeniture succession and the obsession with lineage. Women received the right to vote and the right to request a divorce on the basis of infidelity. The Meiji emphasis on Confucian values and national mythology disappeared from education.

New demographic trends emerged, including a later age of marriage and a smaller difference in age between groom and bride, the birth of two children in quick succession, few children born out of wedlock, and a low divorce rate. Lifetime employment became the norm for Japanese men, especially during the post-war economic boom of the 1950s, 60s, and 70s. A middle class ideology established a gendered family pattern with separate social spheres: a salaried husband to provide the family income, a housewife to manage the home and nurture the children, and a commitment by the children to education. Better health and nutrition meant a rapid extension of life expectancy, and government policies have encouraged people to form  to manage a rapidly aging society.

 marriages, arranged by the parents or a matchmaker, remained the norm immediately after the war, although the decades which followed saw a steady rise in the number of  "love matches." The distinction between the two has blurred: parents almost always consulted young people before "arranging" a marriage, and many young people asked an employer or teacher to serve as matchmaker for their "love match." Three in five couples meet in the workplace or through friends or siblings.

Newer services like Pairs, with 8 million users, or Omiai have introduced ID checks, age limits, strict moderation, and use of artificial intelligence to arrange matches for serious seekers. Profiles typically include age, location, height, career, and salary, but can also include interests, hobbies, and familial interests.

The term "marriage hunting" (or ), has become popular since 2007. It reflects a professional class of matchmaking services which arrange meetings between potential partners, typically through social events, and often includes the exchange of resumes. , and the associations they are members of, have become increasingly popular since 2005. The Japanese government has also produced papers regarding the use of marriage agencies, notably for stimulating international marriage as a method of combating issues of declining population.

Demographic 

According to the 2010 census, 58.9% of Japan's adult population is married, 13.9% of women and 3.1% of men are widowed, and 5.9% of women and 3.8% of men are divorced. The annual number of marriages has dropped since the early 1970s, while divorces have shown a general upward trend.

Marriage and fertility 

The decline of marriage in Japan, as fewer people marry and do so later in life, is a widely cited explanation for the plummeting birth rate. Although the total fertility rate has dropped since the 1970s (to 1.43 in 2013), birth statistics for married women have remained fairly constant (at around 2.1) and most married couples have two or more children. Economic factors, such as the cost of raising a child, work–family conflicts, and insufficient housing, are the most common reasons for young mothers (under 34) to have fewer children than desired.

The number of single-child or childless couples has increased since 2002 (to 23.3 percent in 2010) even as the desire for larger families remains the same. Only 2% of births occurred outside of marriage, compared to 30-60% of births in Europe and North America. This is due to social taboos, legal pressure, and financial hurdles.

Half of Japan's single mothers live below the poverty line, among the highest for OECD countries. In addition, an estimated 3.5 million Japanese children, one in six of those below the age of 18, are from households classed as experiencing "relative poverty" by the OECD.

Fewer marriages 
Almost 90% of unmarried Japanese intend to marry, and yet the percentage of people who do not continues to rise. Between 1990 and 2010, the percentage of 50 year-old people who had never married roughly quadrupled for men to 20.1%, and doubled for women to 10.6%. The Ministry of Health, Labour and Welfare predicts these numbers to rise to 29% of men and 19.2% of women by 2035. The government's population institute estimated in 2014 that women in their early 20s had a one-in-four chance of never marrying, and a two-in-five chance of remaining childless.

Recent media coverage has sensationalized surveys from the Japan Family Planning Association and the Cabinet Office that show a declining interest in dating and sexual relationships among young people, especially among men. However, changes in sexuality and fertility are more likely an outcome of the decline in family formation than its cause. Since the usual purpose of dating in Japan is marriage, the reluctance to marry often translates to a reluctance to engage in more casual relationships.

The majority of Japanese people remain committed to traditional ideas of family, with a husband who provides financial support, a wife who works in the home, and two children. Labor practices, such as long working hours, health insurance, and the national pension system, are premised on a traditional breadwinner model. As a result, Japan has largely maintained a gender-based division of labor with one of the largest gender pay gaps in the developed world, even as other countries began moving towards more equal arrangements in the 1970s.

However, economic stagnation, anemic wage growth, and job insecurity have made it more and more difficult for young Japanese couples to secure the income necessary to create a conventional family, despite their desire to do so. Japan was once well known for lifetime employment, but after the burst of the Japanese asset price bubble and the 1997 Asian financial crisis, regular employment for unmarried men age 25-34 dropped from 78% in 1982 to 55% in 2010 as companies began employing more people on temporary or part-time contracts. These non-regular employees earn about 53% less than regular ones on a comparable monthly basis, according to the Labor Ministry, and as primary earners are seven times more likely to fall below the poverty line. Men in this group are more than twice as reluctant to consider marriage, and in their 30s they are about 40% less likely to be married than those with regular employment.

According to the sociologist Masahiro Yamada, the failure of conventions to adapt to the economic and social realities of Japanese society has caused a "gap in family formation" between those who succeed in creating a conventional family and those who remain single and childless.

Later marriages 
The average age at first marriage in Japan has climbed steadily from the middle of the 20th century to around 31 for men and 29 for women in 2013, among the highest in Asia. Women postpone marriage for a variety of reasons, including high personal and financial expectations, increasing independence afforded by education and employment, and the difficulty of balancing work and family. Masahiro Yamada coined the term  for unmarried adults in their late 20s and 30s who live with their parents, though it usually refers to women.

International marriages 
Main Article: International marriage (Japan)

Of the 599,007 marriages registered in 2019, 21,919 (or about 1 in 30) were between a Japanese and a foreign national, according to the Ministry of Health, Labour, and Welfare. The number of international unions rose rapidly in the 1980s and 90s, peaked in 2006 at 44,701 (about 1 in 16), and has declined since then. Changes in the Immigration Control Act in 2005, which made it more difficult for Philippine nationals to work in Japan, are one cause of the decline. Filipino women saw the largest drop, from 12,150 in 2006 to 3,118 or 20.1% of foreign brides in 2013. Many Filipino women come to Japan as entertainers, and some have been victims of domestic violence.

Of the 14,911 non-Japanese brides in 2019, most came from China (about 31.6%), followed by the Philippines (about 24.5%), Korea (about 11.2%), Thailand (about 6.6%), Brazil (about 2.1%), United States (about 1.9%). The 7,008 grooms came from Korea (about 25.1%), United States (about 14.1%), China (about 13%), and Brazil (about 4.7%).

Of the 1 million children born in Japan in 2013, 2.2% had one or more non-Japanese parent. The rise in international households has sometimes led to conflicts over custody. Biracial Japanese children are often called , although the term is considered offensive by some.

For an international marriage to take place in Japan, the following documentation is required:

 A sworn Affidavit of Competency to Marry
 An original birth certificate
 Passport, Japanese Drivers License, or Residents Card ( Card)
 Certificate of Marriage Notification

In certain cases additional documentation is required, notably for those from China.

Domestic violence 
According to a summary of surveys by Japan's Gender Equality Bureau in 2006, 33.2% of wives and 17.4% of husbands have experienced either threats, physical violence, or rape, more than 10% of women repeatedly. This violence almost always occurred after marriage. Dating abuse has also been reported by 13.5% of women and 5.2% of men.

Marriage law 

A marriage is legally recognized once a couple has successfully submitted the required documents to the city hall registrar to change their status in their  family registration sheet. No ceremony is required under Japanese law. The family registration sheet serves as birth certificate, proof of citizenship, marriage license, and death certificate.

Since 1947, couples have been permitted to choose either the surname of the husband or wife, consistent with a ban on separate surnames first imposed in 1898. Married couples are estimated to choose the man's surname 96% of the time, although some women continue to use their maiden name informally. The ban has survived several legal challenges on the basis of gender inequality, most recently in 2015. When marriage is used to adopt a male heir, the husband takes his wife's family name.

International marriages are subject to separate rules within Japan. Foreigners in Japan do not have their own family registration sheet, and therefore those who marry a Japanese national are listed on his or her family's sheet. Foreign spouses in Japan are eligible for a long-term dependent visa.

Children born out of wedlock are recorded as illegitimate on their mother's family register, although they can be legitimized by a later acknowledgment of paternity. Illegitimate children were eligible for half the inheritance of legitimate ones until a court ruling in 2013.

Wedding ceremonies

A common description of Japan's religious syncretism says: "Born Shinto, married Christian, die Buddhist." In practice, however, elements of all three major traditions tend to be practiced side-by-side. Japanese weddings usually begin with a Shinto or Western Christian-style ceremony for family members and very close friends before a reception dinner and after-party at a restaurant or hotel banquet hall. There the couple's extended families and friends make speeches and offer  in a special envelope. Close family pay about twice as much as friends.

Japanese Shinto ceremonies

Traditional , which account for around one in six of Japanese weddings, are held in the main building of a shrine.

Grooms wear a black crested  jacket and loose, skirt-like  with a vertical stripe.

Christian chapel ceremonies

Christian wedding ceremonies have since the mid-1990s displaced the Shinto rite and continue to remain Japan's wedding ceremony of choice. Christian wedding ceremonies have in the last thirty years moved from the sideline to the mainstream of Japanese society. The popularity of Christian wedding ceremonies represents new widespread acceptance, commercialization, and popularity of a religious ceremony. The postwar history of Christian wedding ceremonies is best understood in light of the efforts made by traditional Christian churches and the bridal industry to meet the religious needs and demands of Japan's largely "nonreligious" constituency.

Although the Japanese have unprecedented access to the Catholic Church, the majority of weddings in Japan follow the Protestant liturgy. As such the ceremony includes elements typical to a traditional Protestant wedding including hymns, benedictions, prayers, bible readings, an exchange of rings, wedding kiss, and vows before God. It is typical for a bride to enter with her father and then be "given away" to her husband—an exchange that usually involves bowing and shaking hands. In recent years, the custom of lowering the veil has also become popular. During the veil lowering the mother of the bride lowers the veil for her daughter before she continues down the "virgin road" with her father toward her husband. In the case of a non-Japanese wedding minister, the ceremony is commonly performed in a mix of Japanese and a western language (typically, English).

Non-religious or civil ceremonies
Non-religious or civil ceremonies often take place in a banquet hall, before or during the reception party, with a Master of Ceremonies officiating and guests seated around tables. Although these ceremonies often adopt Western elements, especially a wedding dress for the bride and a tuxedo for the groom, they forego any religious connotations.

Some younger couples choose to abandon formality entirely for a "no host party" wedding, which emphasizes celebration rather than ceremony. The guests consist primarily of the couple's friends, who pay an attendance fee.

See also
 Aging of Japan
 Confucian view of marriage
 Japanese family
 Family law in Japan
 Same-sex marriage in Japan
 Shinto wedding
 Women in Japan

References

Bibliography

 Edwards, Walter. Modern Japan Through Its Weddings: Gender, Person, and Society in Ritual Portrayal. Stanford: Stanford University Press, 1989.
 Fukutake, Tadashi. Japanese Rural Society. Trans. by R. P. Dore. Tokyo: Oxford University Press, 1967.
 Hendry, Joy. Marriage in Changing Japan: Community & Society. Rutland, Vt, and Tokyo, 1979.
 Kawashima, Takeyoshi. Kekkon (Marriage). Tokyo: Iwanami Shinso, 1954.
 LeFebvre, J. (2015). Christian wedding ceremonies: "Nonreligiousness" in contemporary Japan. Japanese Journal of Religious Studies, 42(2), 185-203.
 National Institute of Population and Social Security Research (IPSS). "Attitudes toward Marriage and Family among Japanese Singles." 2011.
 National Institute of Population and Social Security Research (IPSS). "Marriage Process and Fertility of Japanese Married Couples." 2011.
 Tamura, Naoomi. The Japanese Bride. New York: Harper & Brother Publishers, 1893.

Marriage, unions and partnerships in Japan
Japan
Japan